Duvid Swirsky (born April 2, 1976) is an Israeli-American singer, songwriter, guitarist, and composer. He is best known as the guitarist, co-vocalist, and founding member of the Jewish rock band Moshav. He has also performed with the folk rock bands Skyland (with C Lanzbom) and Distant Cousins (with Dov Rosenblatt and Ami Kozak).

Early life
Swirsky was born in the United States before his family moved to Mevo Modi'im, Israel when he was ten. The village's founder, influential Jewish singer Rabbi Shlomo Carlebach, would frequently visit the village and perform for the residents. Swirsky first played professionally when he was 15 as part of Carlebach's band at a Tel Aviv concert.

Career

Moshav

Growing up in Mevo Modi'in, Swirsky became close friends with his neighbor Yehuda Solomon, whose father, Ben Zion Solomon, was a founding member of Diaspora Yeshiva Band and one of the first residents of the village. Swirsky and Solomon performed together from a young age and formed the Moshav Band in 1996. They have released ten albums since 1998 and have been credited, alongside Blue Fringe and Soulfarm, with pioneering a new movement of Jewish rock in the 1990s.

Skyland
Swirsky briefly collaborated with Soulfarm guitarist C Lanzbom in 2012 under the name Skyland. Their self-titled debut album was released on January 10, 2012 through Desert Rock Records and Sweet Sense Music.

Distant Cousins

Later in 2012, Swirsky, Blue Fringe lead singer Dov Rosenblatt, and singer-songwriter Ami Kozak formed the indie pop group Distant Cousins. They released two self-titled EPs (one in 2014, one in 2015) and have had their music appear in commercials, television shows, and films, including a soundtrack song, "Are You Ready (On Your Own)", for the 2014 film This Is Where I Leave You.

Personal life
Swirsky lives in Los Angeles with his wife and two sons.

Discography

Solo 
2022: "Anani" (single)

With Moshav

 The Things You Can't Afford (1998)
 Days (1999)
 Lost Time (2002)
 Return Again (2004)
 Malachim (2005)
 The Best of Moshav Band: Higher and Higher (2005)
 Misplaced (2006)
 Dancing in a Dangerous World (2010)
 New Sun Rising (2013)
 Shabbat Vol. 1 (2014)

With Skyland
Skyland (2012)

With Distant Cousins

Next of Kin (2019)

Other
1996: Ben Zion Solomon and Sons, Give Me Harmony: Songs of R' Shlomo Carlebach – bass
2008: Rachel Diggs, Center of the Earth – composer on "Wanted"
2018: Shirat, Crazy EP – featured on "No One's Watching"
2019: Various, A Million Little Things Season 1 soundtrack – contributes "Be My Katie"

References

External links

 
 
 Duvid Swirsky on Spotify

Living people
1976 births
Jewish rock musicians
Jewish American musicians
Jewish American composers
Jewish American songwriters
Israeli emigrants to the United States
Moshav (band) members
21st-century American Jews